The Central District of Mehran County is a district (bakhsh) in Mehran County, Ilam Province, Iran. At the 2006 census, its population was 20,019, in 4,443 families.  The District has one city: Mehran. The District has one rural district (dehestan): Mohsen Ab Rural District.

References 

Districts of Ilam Province
Mehran County